The 1993–94 UEFA Champions League was the 39th season of the UEFA Champions League, UEFA's premier club football tournament, and the second season with the UEFA Champions League logo (it was adopted in the group stage and semi-finals, the rest of the tournament continued to be called "European Champion Clubs' Cup" or "European Cup"). The competition was won by Milan, their fifth title, beating Barcelona 4–0 in the final. Marseille were the defending champions, but were not allowed to enter the competition due their involvement in a match-fixing scandal in Division 1 the season prior. This saw them stripped of their league title and demoted to Division 2 at the end of 1993–94. This was the first and only time which the defending champions did not participate in the following season of the competition. Third-placed Monaco took the vacated French berth (second-placed Paris Saint-Germain, who refused the defaulted French title, competed in the Cup Winners' Cup instead as Coupe de France winners).

There were changes made to the UEFA Champions League's format from the previous year. After two seasons, with the groups, it introduced one legged semi-finals taking place after the group stage, meaning the two sides qualified from each group as group winners playing the semi-finals at home.

This edition was marked by the absence of Yugoslav participants because Yugoslavia was under UN economic sanctions. Yugoslav participants were frequently present in advanced stages of the competition with Red Star Belgrade having won the European Cup in 1991 and finished second in the group the following season. FK Partizan were to represent Yugoslavia in this edition, but were not allowed to participate. Meanwhile, Croatia, Belarus, Moldova, Georgia and Wales entered their champions for the first time this edition.

Teams

42 national champions participated in 1993–94 UEFA Champions League season. 20 lowest-ranked of them by 1993 UEFA club ranking entered in the Preliminary Round, 22 best-ranked champions entered in the First Round.

Notes

Round and draw dates
The schedule of the competition is as follows. All draws were held in Geneva, Switzerland.

Preliminary round

First round

Second round

Group stage

The group stage began on 24 November 1993 and ended on 13 April 1994. The eight teams were divided into two groups of four, and the teams in each group played against each other on a home-and-away basis, meaning that each team played a total of six group matches. For each win, teams were awarded two points, with one point awarded for each draw. At the end of the group stage, the two teams in each group with the most points advanced to the semi-finals.

All teams except Milan and Porto made their group stage debuts. Two of these teams (Barcelona and Anderlecht) had previously contested the 1991–92 group stage, the only season of the European Cup to adopt such a format.

Group A

Group B

Knockout stage

Bracket

Semi-finals

Final

Top goalscorers
The top scorers from the 1993–94 UEFA Champions League (excluding preliminary round) are as follows:

See also
1993–94 European Cup Winners' Cup
1993–94 UEFA Cup

Notes

References

External links
1993–94 All matches – season at UEFA website
European Cup results at Rec.Sport.Soccer Statistics Foundation
 All scorers 1993–94 UEFA Champions League (excluding preliminary round) according to protocols UEFA + all scorers preliminary round
 1993/94 UEFA Champions League - results and line-ups (archive)

 
Champions League
UEFA Champions League seasons